The Super Globetrotters is a 30-minute Saturday morning animated series produced by Hanna-Barbera Productions. It premiered on NBC on September 22, 1979 and ran for 13 episodes. It was a spin-off series from Hanna-Barbera's Harlem Globetrotters. Unlike the original Globetrotters series, The Super Globetrotters was solely produced by Hanna-Barbera, whereas the original series was co-produced with CBS Productions. Thus, Super Globetrotters later became incorporated into the library of Warner Bros. while the original series remains under CBS ownership. The Super Globetrotters will appear in the HBO Max original series Jellystone!.

The Super Globetrotters aired in its own half-hour timeslot from September 22 to November 3, 1979 and beginning November 10, episodes were packaged together with Godzilla under the title The Godzilla/Globetrotters Adventure Hour which ran until September 20, 1980.

Like many animated series created by Hanna-Barbera in the 1970s, the show contained a laugh track created by the studio.
This is one of a number of shows made before the mid-1980s seen on the Cartoon Network and Boomerang to have been taken from PAL transfers.

Plot
This show featured the basketball team Harlem Globetrotters as undercover superheroes, who would transform from their regular forms by entering magic portable lockers. Each member of the group had individual super powers and could fly. The Super Globetrotters gained their powers through an element called Globetron and another exposure would weaken them on occasions.

The Globetrotters received their missions from a basketball-styled talking satellite called the Crime Globe. Most episodes culminated in the Super Globetrotters challenging the villain and his henchmen to a basketball game for whatever treasure or device they sought. The civilian Globetrotters were always bested by the villains' super-powers in the first half, but they would use their own super-powers in the second half (often at the admonition of the Crime Globe) to save the day.

Characters

Super Globetrotters
 Nate Branch/Liquid Man (voiced by Scatman Crothers) - Could turn himself into water and acts as the leader on and off the court. Also called "Fluid Man" and even "Aquaman".
 Freddie "Curly" Neal/Super Sphere (voiced by Stu Gilliam) - Could retract his limbs into his head to bounce, smash, and grow. Naturally, his head looked like a basketball.
 James "Twiggy" Sanders/Spaghetti Man (voiced by Buster Jones) - Could use his body as a ladder or a rope.
 Louis "Sweet Lou" Dunbar/Gizmo (voiced by Adam Wade) - Had an immense afro, which contained an unlimited supply of gadgets (including one that fits the current situation that the Super Globetrotters are in). Also called "Gizmo Man".
 Hubert "Geese" Ausbie/Multi Man (voiced by Johnny Williams) - Could clone himself to surround and mystify foes. Similar to DC Comics character Multiplex and Marvel Comics character Jamie Madrox
 Crime Globe (voiced by Frank Welker) - A basketball-shaped satellite that would alert the Globetrotters of villainous activities and even give them strategies to fight them in basketball matches.

Fluid Man/Liquid Man, Multi Man, and Spaghetti Man (previously Coil Man) were recycled intact from the previous Hanna-Barbera cartoon The Impossibles.

Villains
 Museum Man (voiced by Herb Vigran) – Cratchit is a disgruntled history museum janitor who could bring fossils and statues to life through a special remote control called the Skeleton Simulator in a plot to take over Big City. The Super Globetrotters find Museum Man at the Museum and end up trapped in a light trap. Museum Man marches through the streets with his army of fossils and statues. When it comes to the local carnival, the Super Globetrotters try to trap him on the Carousel which doesn't work. He ends up turning the Carousel Horses to life. When it comes to the Big City Bank, the Super Globetrotters plan a trap for Museum Man there which doesn't work. On the advice of the Crime Globe, the Super Globetrotters go up against Museum Man in a basketball game for the fate of Big City. Museum Man's Fearless Fossils end up overcoming the Globetrotters. Upon the advice of the Crime Globe, the Globetrotters become the Super Globetrotters and turn the tide against the Fearless Fossils. After the Super Globetrotters defeated the Fearless Fossils, Museum Man tries to use his Skeleton Simulator only for its batteries to get wet. Museum Man manages to get away and was last heard heading to Retro City with the Super Globetrotters on his tail.
 Egyptian Guard - An Egyptian Guard statue brought to life by Museum Man.
 Fearless Fossils - A bunch of dinosaur fossils brought to life by Museum Man. They serve as his basketball team.
 Fido Dino - A sauropod fossil brought to life by Museum Man. He serves as Museum Man's mode of transportation.
 Bwana Bob (voiced by Joe Baker) - A big game hunter who lives on his private island of Bongo Zuny. He has stocked his island with wild animals and traps so that he can hunt his ultimate prey which is man. A cruise ship carrying the Globetrotters ends up crashing off the coast of Bwana Bob's island. Bwana Bob disguised himself as a hotel manager with his house being disguised as a hotel. It was soon discovered to be a trap for the Globetrotters where they ended up hunted by Bwana Bob. The Super Globetrotters kept falling into his traps yet managing to get out of it. When it came to the people from the ship, Bwana challenges the Globetrotters to a basketball team against his Bongo Zuny Timid Turtles for the fate of them and the people from the cruise ship. After the Bongo Zuny Timid Turtles are defeated, Bwana Bob and Putt Putt end up running off and get caught in the rope trap.
 Putt Putt (voiced by Frank Welker) - Bwana Bob's Native henchman.
 Bongo Zuny Timid Turtles - A bunch of giant turtles that make up Bwana Bob's basketball team.
 Facelift (voiced by John Stephenson) - Facelift is an alien that runs on nuclear energy who can steal the faces of people and place them on his Demon Droids. He used this ability in order to steal the faces of the world's leaders. The Super Globetrotters managed to steal his hydro-nucleic core that gives Facelift his powers at the North Pole. When a seal throws the hydro-nucleic core into the water, Facelift exploded.
 Demon Droids - Faceless robots that serve Facelift.
 Whaleman (voiced by Michael Rye) – Whaleman is a pirate who has been using the mechanical whale named Moby Whale and his unnamed crew members to steal supertankers containing 50 tons of oil. The Super Globetrotters use their boats in order to get into Moby Whale. Whaleman plans to use the stolen oil in order to control the world's oil. The Super Globetrotters managed to evade Whaleman and get out of Moby Whale. They follow Moby Whale to an island where Whaleman makes his headquarters and is storing the stolen supertankers. They find Whaleman who has tricked the islanders into giving them free oil and try to convince the islanders that Whaleman is not what he claims to be. The Super Globetrotters end up challenging Whaleman and his crew to a game of jungle basketball (the one score version) for the fate of the stolen oil and to prove that they are the actual Globetrotters. During the basketball game, Whaleman's fifth player is revealed to be Moby Whale. After defeating Whaleman, the islanders know the Globetrotters are the real ones anyway. Whaleman and his crew are arrested by the Navy.
 Robo (voiced by John Stephenson) – A mad scientist and robotician who created the Globots. Robo used the Globots to help in his revenge on Dr. G.G. Goodley after Robo's funding to further his robot projects was cut by him. He start by having the Globots committed a crime spree that would frame the Globetrotters. While the real Globtrotters are in jail, they learn from Crime Globe that Robo is behind this. Upon transforming into the Super Globetrotters, they break out of jail to pursue Robo. Robo then has the Globots target Dyno-Dam to overload its turbines. Robo then plans to have the Globots raid the Space Center. The Super Globetrotters visit G.G. Goodley on what he knows about Robo. Upon making it to the Space Center, the Super Globetrotters end up encountering the Globots who unleash a dose of Globetron. Back at G.G. Goodley's lab, the Super Globetrotters and G.G. Goodley are confronted by Robo and the Globots as Robo prepares for his revenge. Just then, the authorities arrive and end up arresting both parties. At the prison, the warden arranges a prison yard basketball game to determine who are the real Globetrotters. The Globots end up setting themselves to cheat mode where they beat the Globetrotters in the first half. When it comes to the second half, the Globetrotters take G.G. Goodley's advice to become the Super Globetrotters to combat the Globots. When the Globetrotters defeat the Globots, Robo and the Globots are incarcerated and the real Globetrotters are cleared of all charges. Robo vows to use his genius for good when he gets out.
 Globots - Evil robot duplicates of the Globetrotters.
 Tattoo Man (voiced by Lennie Weinrib) - A space pirate who could animate the tattoos on his body (similar to Green Lantern villain Tattooed Man). He targeted the world's gold. The Super Globetrotters go up against his basketball team for the fate of the stolen gold. After the Globetrotters defeat his basketball team, Tattoo Man eventually reforms and starts showing off his tattoo tricks to the children.
 Arms the Octopus - Tattoo Man's octopus henchman summoned from one of Tattoo Man's tattoos.
 Atlas - Tattoo Man's super-strong henchman summoned from one of Tattoo Man's tattoos.
 Glob - Tattoo Man's slimy henchman summoned from one of Tattoo Man's tattoos.
 Mercury - Tattoo Man's super-fast henchman summoned from one of Tattoo Man's tattoos.
 Movie Man (voiced by John Stephenson) - Movie Man is a movie director who uses movie-motif plots. His henchmen ended up stealing a top secret mystery robot that is filled with Globetron. When transporting the robot upon capturing the Globetrotters, the robot is activated by a bump in the road which causes it to explode in any minute. The Globetrotters managed to disarm the robot before it can explode and then returned into the cage as they arrive at Marvo Studios. When finding the robot, Movie Man challenges the Super Globetrotters to a basketball game against the Mighty Movie Monsters for the fate of the robot which Movie Man films and his crew members try to help the Mighty Movie Monsters win. Once the Super Globetrotters defeat the Mighty Movie Monsters, Movie Man and his henchmen are arrested as Movie Man plans to make a movie in prison called "Crime Does Not Pay."
 Camera Man - An unnamed camera man who filmed the basketball game against the Super Globetrotters and the Mighty Movie Monsters. When the Mighty Movie Monsters were defeated, he admitted to Movie Man that they were out of film since half-time.
 Effects Man - Movie Man's special effects specialist who uses a special effects box to pull off any special effects.
 Lighting Man (voiced by Michael Rye) - Movie Man's lighting technician who uses a special crystal to pull off the lighting effects.
 Make-Up Master (voiced by Frank Welker) - A make-up artist who is Movie Man's master of disguise.
 Sound Man (voiced by John Stephenson) - Movie Man's sound effects specialist.
 Stunt Woman - Movie Man's female stunt performer.
 Mighty Movie Monsters - Movie Man's basketball team who are based on the monsters and villains of different monster movies.
 Batula - A vampire who is a member of the Mighty Movie Monsters. He is a spoof of Count Dracula.
 Dink Dong (vocal effects provided by John Stephenson) - A large gorilla from the "lost world" who is a member of the Mighty Movie Monsters. He is a spoof of King Kong.
 Dinorga - A dinosaur who is a member of the Mighty Movie Monsters.
 Globula - A slimy alien from outer space who is a member of the Mighty Movie Monsters. He is a spoof of the Blob.
 Peerless Frankenstein - A monster who is a member of the Mighty Movie Monsters. He is a spoof of Frankenstein's Monster.
 Bad Blue Bart (voiced by Paul Winchell) - Bad Blue Bart is a western outlaw who used the remote-controlled Phantom Cowboys in order to take control of Miss Jenny's Bar-B-Q Ranch in Tombstone Valley in order to get to the Steam Wells under the Bar-B-Q-Ranch. When Bad Blue Bart confronts the Super Globetrotters at the Bar-B-Q Ranch, Crime Globe recommends that the Super Globetrotters go up against Bad Blue Bart in a rodeo contest. After a tie in the rodeo, the Super Globetrotters go up against Bad Blue Bart's Phantom Cowboys in a western version of a basketball game. The Super Globetrotters defeat the Phantom Cowboys and Bad Blue Bart ends up in the calaboose.
 Fenwick (voiced by Frank Welker) - Miss Jenny's ranch foreman who is actually a henchman of Bad Blue Bart in a plot to get to the steam wells under the Bar-B-Q-Ranch.
 The Phantom Cowboy (vocal effects provided by Paul Winchell) - The Phantom Cowboy is a steam-operated, remote-controlled zombie who has been causing trouble in Tombstone Valley. Five of them were controlled by Bad Blue Bart and later make up his basketball team.
 The Time Lord (voiced by Don Messick) - Time Lord is a villain who had a special Time Crystal that could alter time including to summon any criminals out of history to do his bidding. He plans to steal T.I.M. (short for Time Isolation Machine), a time machine built from a grandfather clock in order to take over the world in the past. Time Lord manages to freeze time on the Super Globetrotters and place them in a Time-Warp Barrier in a plan to send them to the Age of Dinosaurs. With info from the Crime Globe, Liquid Man evaporates himself and frees the other Globetrotters and T.I.M. Time Lord has his historic henchmen target the Globetrotters while Time Lord reclaims T.I.M. The Globetrotters plan to use the Time Warp Time Barrier and Multi Man in order to lure Time Lord's henchmen to the device with sacks of fake gold. Time Lord challenges the Super Globetrotters to a game a basketball tournament to determine the fate of fate of T.I.M., though Time Lord uses his Time Crystal to slow down the Globetrotters and speed up his henchmen as Time Lord places his Time Crystal into overdrive. With advice from Crime Globe, the Globetrotters use Multi Man's shield in order to protect themselves from Time Lord's Time Crystal. The Super Globetrotters use this tactic to block the Time Lord's Time Crystal as Time Lord ends up surrendering upon being surrounded by Multi Man. Time Lord and his henchmen are arrested and T.I.M. is returned to the Time Research Center.
 Eagle (voiced by Frank Welker) - A historic criminal who is the best look-out.
 Lioness (voiced by Marlene Aragon) - A historic cat burglar.
 Tumbler - A historic safecracker.
 Wheels - A historic criminal who is the best getaway car driver.
 Count Bragula (voiced by Lennie Weinrib) - A vampire who is the leader of the Transylvanian Terrors. He plotted to reclaim Transylvania and place it under his control. Transylvania's Mayor Gaga had the Globetrotters called in. When the Globetrotters' bus had a flat tire, they end up stumbling onto Count Bragula's castle. Using the alias of John Jones, Count Bragula has Igor show the Globetrotters to their rooms. Count Bragula plots to have them trapped in his dungeon in order to keep them from playing in a basketball game against the Transylvania Terrors. Upon learning of Count Bragula's plot, the Globetrotters transform into the Super Globetrotters and escape from the dungeon. Count Bragula appears before Mayor Gaga and tells her that his group will go up against the Globetrotters. The Globetrotters had a hard time going up against the Transylvanian Terrors in the first half. Upon advice from the Crime Globe, the Globetrotters become the Super Globetrotters to deal with the Transylvania Terrors in the second half. After the Transylvania Terrors' defeat, Count Bragula is arrested and the money he has is now outdated. Count Bragula ends up becoming a street sweeper as part of his 30-year community service. He is a spoof of Count Dracula.
 Igor (voiced by Frank Welker) - Count Bragula's second-in-command and member of the Transylvanian Terrors. Following Count Bragula's defeat, Igor has been made to oversee Count Bragula's 30-year community service.
 Frightenstein - Member of the Transylvanian Terrors. Following Count Bragula's defeat, Frightenstein becomes a crossing guard. He is a spoof of Frankenstein's Monster.
 Old Lovable Mummy - Member of the Transylvanian Terrors. Following Count Bragula's defeat, the Mummy becomes a playground attendant.
 Vampire Bats - Count Bragula's pet vampire bats.
 Wolf Person - A werewolf who is a member of the Transylvanian Terrors. Following Count Bragula's defeat, Wolf Person ends up going with the Globetrotters. He is a spoof of the Wolf Man.
 Bull Moose (voiced by John Stephenson) - A moose-themed villain who wore fake antlers and was assisted by a gang of livestock-themed henchmen called the Underworld Gang. He had a Golden Ray Gun that turned anything that is hit by its rays to gold. He stole the Goose that Laid the Golden Eggs in order to complete his Golden Ray Gun in a plot to take over Breadbasket City. The Super Globetrotters follow Bull Moose into his hideout and end up running into each of his henchmen. Despite the fact that the Globetrotters took down his henchmen who are handed over to the police and recovered the Goose that Laid the Golden Eggs, Bull Moose attacks by using his Golden Ray Gun on the Mayor of Breadbasket City, the Chief of Police, and the Fair Official. Bull Moose then challenges the Super Globetrotters to a basketball game depending who will gain Breadbasket City. During the basketball game, Bull Moose used his Golden Ray Gun to make things difficult for the Globetrotters. Using mirror wristbands, the Super Globetrotters undo the Golden Ray Gun's effects and win the competition. Bull Moose and his gang are arrested.
 Bull Moose Dogs - Bull Moose's three robot dogs.
 Ham - Bull Moose's pig-themed henchman.
 Ponytail - Bull Moose's horse-themed henchwoman with super-speed.
 Stomper - Bull Moose's tough bull.
 Weird Beard (voiced by Frank Welker) - Bull Moose's goat-themed henchman.
 Wise Quacker - Bull Moose's duck-themed henchman.
 Woolly Woman - Bull Moose's sheep-themed henchwoman with wool-like hair.
 Merlo the Magician (voiced by John Stephenson) - Merlo is a wizard who leads the Knights of the Crooked Table. He and his Knights of the Crooked Table have been stealing the world's monuments like London Bridge, the Eiffel Tower, the Statue of Liberty, and the Pyramid of Giza. The Super Globetrotters pretend to be a supreme wizard named The Great Curlo and his Merry Men in order to trick Merlo until Super Sphere's stilts were accidentally exposed. The Globetrotters ended up in a basketball game against his knights on horseback in order to reclaim the stolen monuments. After the Globetrotters won, Merlo reluctantly returns the monuments to their rightful locations. He is a spoof of Merlin.
 Knights of the Crooked Table - A group of knights that serve as Merlo's henchmen. They are a spoof of the Knights of the Round Table.
 Attila the Hun (voiced by Frank Welker) – Attila the Hun and his army of Huns had followed a scientist named Professor Herbert George through his Time Transporter from 450 AD to the present. The Huns end up running amok in San Francisco until they run into the Globetrotters. They track Attila the Hun to a Chinese restaurant in Chinatown and end up trapped in his cage. Upon becoming the Super Globetrotters, they go after Attila the Hun who is robbing the San Francisco Mint. The Super Globetrotters then end up going against Attila and his Huns in a basketball tournament to determine who leaves the century. After the Globetrotters won, Attila and his Huns return to their time admitting that they had a time of their life here. Yet Attila and his Huns got off the transporter before their time and were seen in the history books posing as Jesse James and his gang where it was mentioned that they had an encounter with the Super Globetrotters' ancestors.
 Crunch - A super-strong member of Attila's Huns.
 Draco - A fire-breathing member of Attila's Huns.
 Ox - Member of Attila's Huns.

Episodes

Home release
On October 28, 2014, Warner Archive released The Super Globetrotters: The Complete Series on Region 1 DVD as part of their Hanna–Barbera Classics Collection.

Voice cast
 Scatman Crothers as Fluid Man/Nate Branch
 Stu Gilliam as Super Sphere/Freddie "Curly" Neal
 Buster Jones as Spaghetti Man/James "Twiggy" Sanders
 Michael Rye as Narrator, Basketball Announcer, Lighting Man, Mayor of Breadbasket City, Whaleman
 Adam Wade as Gizmo/Louis "Sweet Lou" Dunbar
 Frank Welker as Crime Globe, Attila the Hun, Eagle, Fenwick, Igor, Pingu, Weird Beard, Eagle, MakeasUp Master, Putt Putt
 Johnny Williams as Multi Man/Hubert "Geese" Ausbie

Additional voices
 Marlene Aragon as Lioness
 Joe Baker as Bwana Bob
 Michael Bell as
 Chris Elie as
 Jackie Joseph as
 Margaret McIntyre as
 Don Messick as Time Lord
 John Stephenson as Bull Moose, Dink Dong, Facelift, Merlo the Magician, Movie Man, Professor Herbert George, Robo, Sound Man
 Herbert Vigran as Museum Man/Cratchit
 Janet Waldo as
 Lennie Weinrib as Tattoo Man, Count Bragula
 Nancy Wible as
 Helen Wilson as
 Paul Winchell as Bad Blue Bart, Phantom Cowboys

Production credits
 Executive Producers: Joseph Barbera and William Hanna
 Producers: Art Scott and Alex Lovy
 Directors: Oscar Dufau, Ray Patterson, Carl Urbano, George Gordon
 Story Supervisor: Jim Ryan
 Story Editor: Andy Heyward
 Story: Tom Dagenais, Rowby Goren, Andy Heyward, Robby London, Larry Parr
 Story Direction: Howard Swift
 Recording Director: Art Scott
 Voices: Marlene Aragon, Joe Baker, Michael Bell, Scatman Crothers, Chris Elie, Stu Gilliam, Buster Jones, Jackie Joseph, Margaret McIntyre, Don Messick, Michael Rye, John Stephenson, Herbert Vigran, Janet Waldo, Lennie Weinrib, Frank Welker, Nancy Wible, Johnny Williams, Helen Wilson, Paul Winchell
 Graphics: Iraj Paran, Tom Wogatzke
 Title Design: Don Sheppard
 Musical Director: Hoyt Curtin
 Musical Supervisor: Paul DeKorte
 Creative Producer: Iwao Takamoto
 Design Supervisor: Bob Singer
 Character Designers: Curtis Cim, Jim Franzen, Fred Lucky, Ron Maidenberg
 Layout Supervisors: Bill Hutten, Tony Love, Maurice Pooley
 Layout: Robert Alvarez, Tom Bailey, David Elvin, Les Gibbard, Manuel Gonzalez, Rafael Hernandez, Francisca Moreno, Enrique Perez, David Thwaytes
 Animation Supervisors: Bill Hutten, Tony Love
 Animation: Robert Alvarez, Alberto Conejo, Julio Diez, Manuel G. Galiano, Angel Izquierdo, Roberto Marcano, Ezequiel Martin, Pedro Mohedano, Mariano Rueda
 Animation Coordinators: Carlos Alfonso, Juan Pina
 Background Supervisor: Al Gmuer
 Backgrounds: Lorraine Andrina, Fernando Arce, Greg Battes, Dario Campanile, Gil Dicicco, Dennis Durrell, Fla Ferreira, Bob Gentle, Al Gmuer, Bonnie Goodknight, Ann Guenther, Tom Hames, James Hegedus, Eric Heschong, Jim Hickey, Mike Humphries, Andy Phillipson, Bill Proctor, Vivien Rhyan, Jeff Richards, Jeff Riche, Cal Titus, Dennis Venizelos
 Checking and Scene Planning: Cindy Smith
 Xerography: Star Wirth
 Ink and Paint Supervisor: Alison Victory
 Sound Direction: Richard Olson, Bill Getty
 Camera: Jerry Mills, Ross Avery, Bob Berry, Allen Childs, Marc Debbaudt, Candy Edwards, Curt Hall, Mike Kane, Neil Viker, Roy Wade, Brandy Whittington, Jerry Whittington
 Supervising Film Editor: Larry C. Cowan
 Dubbing Supervisor: Pat Foley
 Music Editor: Mark Green
 Effects Editor: Joe Reitano
 Show Editor: Gil Iverson
 Negative Consultant: William E. DeBoer
 Production Manager: Jayne Barbera
 Post Production Supervisor: Joed Eaton

See also
 List of works produced by Hanna-Barbera
 List of Hanna-Barbera characters

References

 Three of the team's super-heroic identities and powers were taken from the characters of the 1966 Hanna-Barbera cartoon The Impossibles. The transformation sequences and many of the Super Globetrotters' moves were also the same as their Impossibles counterparts.
 Liquid Man was based on Fluid Man, even retaining the "F" insignia of Fluid Man's costume instead of an "L".
 Spaghetti Man was based on Coil Man.
 Multi Man's name was the same in both series, and both heroes carry a shield with an "M" insignia.
 Meadowlark Lemon, J.C. "Gip" Gipson, Bobby Joe Mason, and Pablo Robertson, all of whom had left the team by 1979, are not in the group: Hubert "Geese" Ausbie and Freddie "Curly" Neal are the only remaining members from the 1970 team/cast in the show, with new crew members Nate Branch, James "Twiggy" Sanders, and Louis "Sweet Lou" Dunbar.
 The series did not use Brother Bones's version of "Sweet Georgia Brown" for its theme song, but instead used a sound-alike whistled theme.

External links
 
 The Super Globetrotters episode guide at the Big Cartoon DataBase
 The Super Globetrotters at Don Markstein's Toonopedia. Archived from the original on December 2, 2015.

1970s American animated television series
1970s American black cartoons
1979 American television series debuts
1979 American television series endings
American children's animated comedy television series
American children's animated sports television series
American children's animated superhero television series
American animated television spin-offs
Animation based on real people
Basketball television series
Cultural depictions of the Harlem Globetrotters
NBC original programming
Television series by Hanna-Barbera